Ulwaluko, traditional circumcision and initiation from childhood to adulthood, is an ancient initiation rite practised (though not exclusively) by the Xhosa people, and is commonly practised throughout South Africa. The ritual is traditionally intended as a teaching institution, to prepare young males for the responsibilities of manhood. Therefore, initiates are called abakhwetha in isiXhosa: aba means a group, and kwetha means to learn. A single male in the group is known as an umkhwetha. A male who has not undergone initiation is referred to as inkwenkwe (boy), regardless of his age, and is not allowed to take part in male activities such as tribal meetings.

Practice

The initiation ritual is commonly conducted during late June/early July or late November/ early December. During the ritual process the traditional surgeon (ingcibi) surgically removes the foreskin. After the cut is made, the period of seclusion that follows lasts about one month and is divided into two phases - but this is rarely the case in modern times and/or in urban areas, where it usually lasts at least 4 weeks. During the first 7 days the initiates are confined to a hut (bhoma) and the use of certain foods, for example meat, is restricted, but this may differ as certain homes have their own beliefs or ways of doing things. Water may also be restricted. This phase culminates in the ukojiswa rite, during which food taboos are released, marking the transition to the second phase that lasts a further two to three weeks. During these phases the initiates are looked after by the ikhankatha (traditional attendant). The termination of the period of seclusion commences when the boys are urged to race down to the river to wash themselves, yet again, depending on the location. The hut (Bhoma) and the initiates' possessions are burnt, including their clothing. This symbolizes a new outward appearance the initiates must take on. It is even customary for the initiated to dress very formally for a set period of time after the rite. Each initiate receives a new blanket and is now called "ikrwala" (singular) which means new man or amakrwala. (plural) (new men).

Health concerns
At least 969 initiates have died from complications resulting from the ritual since 1995. Accurate statistics are not available for the number of penile amputations, but it is estimated that their number is roughly twice the number of deaths. Most deaths and complications are the result of incompetence on the part of traditional practitioners. This is the reason why in particular Pondoland is heavily affected by deaths and complications. The Mpondo practised the ritual until King Faku prohibited it in the 1820s after he had lost several of his sons from complications. Initiation schools re-emerged in the 1980s and 1990s, and the ritual is now being practised on a large scale.

In January 2014, Desmond Tutu urged traditional leadership and government to intervene, and "to draw on the skills of qualified medical practitioners to enhance our traditional circumcision practices." He furthermore emphasised the cultural importance of the ritual as educational institution, preparing initiates "to contribute to building a better society for all."

Over the summer in 2019 in South Africa, a total of 21 boys died in separate initiation schools throughout the region. The majority of the deaths were attributed to dehydration due to the restriction of water. The Health Minister Zweli Mkhize recommended that the schools no longer practice the ritual in summer months.

Medical treatment
Victims of failed circumcisions have reported contemplating suicide due to depression and feeling deprived of their manhood. In December 2014, the world's first successful penis transplant was performed by a team led by Dr. Andre van der Merwe. The patient was a 21-year-old man who fell victim of complications due to initiation rituals at illegitimate initiation schools. On 21 April 2017 a second penis transplant was performed by the same team of doctors led by Dr. van der Merwe on a 40-year-old man who lost his penis 17 years prior to the procedure. Doctors have said that due to the circumstances surrounding illegal circumcision schools, South Africa has become one of the countries with the greatest need for penis transplantation.

Homosexuality
Homosexual men in South Africa are still vilified and criticized by their communities. The ritual practise of ‘Ulwaluko’ is a highly respected and sacred cultural practice among the Xhosa and some Nguni speaking peoples of South Africa. It has been alleged that the impact of the practice may threaten the self-esteem of a homosexual young man, although it is not compulsory for any person to go to the 'bush'. Some homosexual men who partook in this ritual reported doing so in order to receive personal validation of cultural manhood, the same can be said of heterosexual uncircumcised men.  Other reasons for partaking in Ulwaluko include fulfilling the desire to meet societal expectations as well as pressure from family to ‘convert’ to heterosexuality through the process of Ulwaluko. The Film ‘The Wound’ premiered at the 2017 Sundance Film Festival and is inspired by Thando Mgqolozana novel ‘A man who is not a man’ which focuses on the experiences of homosexual men during ‘Ulwaluko’. Xhosa traditional leaders criticized the film as being ‘disrespectful’, ‘undermining Xhosa culture’ as it showcased hidden traditions. It in fact reveals nothing of the Xhosa people. The film has been compared to the Oscar winning Moonlight. The practice of 'ulwaluko' is furthermore governed by several pieces of legislation to promote the safety and protection of underage initiates who have fallen victim to unhygienic practices at illegal initiation schools, these laws include the South African Constitution (1996), the Children's Act (2005), the (Eastern Cape) Application of Health Standards in Traditional Circumcision Act (2001), and the Traditional Health Practitioners’ Act (2004).

Modern day perceptions

The ancient ritual of Ulwaluko is still perceived as relevant by young Xhosa men, and Xhosa people. [Mdedetyana, 2019] It is a sacred family-oriented practice. Many are emotionally attached and find cultural significance in the ritual. Male circumcision is accessible in the hospital/clinical setting however, this option has not replaced Ulwaluko as it does not equate to the cultural meaning of Ulwaluko beyond the removal of the foreskin.(Mdedetyana, 2019) Several ceremonies take place before the young person 'enters' in which the family gathers to seek blessings and see the boy off. The young boys are reintroduced to their ancestors and 'uQamata', they are taught about their history, are taught discipline, to be family men and how to be responsible young people who contribute positively to society. There is absolutely (or should not be) no sex in the bush, hetero or otherwise, as it is considered a holy place safe for children (like Sunday school). Women and young women are not allowed, although in some families even young children may be allowed visitation as young children are venerated and represent purity and innocence. Therefore, the sexual identity of the initiate himself is less of a consideration, if at all, as he is himself still a boy child, therefore his innocence is not severed at the incision but marks (inxeba) a bittersweet transition from boy to man. He is not 'made' a man in the 'bush'.

Controversies
Details of the ritual are not supposed to be disclosed to females or non-initiated males; according to the principle of 'what happens in the bush, stays in the bush', according to some sources. Cultural prejudice may be so great that uncircumcised or 'improperly' circumcised men are attacked and beaten for their lack of conformity, it is not clear conformity to what or the link to the short term practice itself. In March 2014 a young man was assaulted after he had spoken out during a community meeting about the complications he sustained through the ritual.

While working in South Africa, Dutch medical doctor Dingeman J. Rijken treated many patients with medical complications from Ulwaluko. In January 2014 he set up the website ulwaluko.co.za to "inform prospective initiates and the broader community about the dark secrets of the ritual." The website includes detailed information about the medical problems accompanying the ritual and offers possible solutions to mitigate these risks. It also features a gallery of over 150 photographs of penises injured through botched ritual circumcisions, with complications including infection, gangrene, and autoamputation. The photos, taken by Dr. Rijken and other medical providers, were published with patient consent. The publication of these photographs sparked outrage among many traditional leaders in the Eastern Cape. They demanded that the South African Film and Publication Board (FSB) shut down the website, even though the FSB was not the responsible authority. The Board however ruled that the website was "scientific with great educative value," addressing a "societal problem needing urgent intervention."

See also
Lebollo la banna
Intonjane
Onofotyela

References 

24. ^ Mdedetyana, L.S. 2019. Medical male circumcision and Xhosa masculinities: Tradition and transformation, A mini-thesis submitted in partial fulfillment of the requirements for the degree of Magister Artium in Medical Anthropology in the department of Anthropology and Sociology, University of the Western Cape. http://etd.uwc.ac.za/xmlui/bitstream/handle/11394/6629/mdedetyana_arts_2019.pdf?sequence=1&isAllowed=y

External links 
 The boys who lost their manhood – about young men who suffered from penile amputation due to complications of the ritual.

Circumcision
Xhosa culture
Transplantation
Rites of passage